The Motocrotte, officially called Caninette and informally  chiraclette was a small motorized vehicle designed to vacuum up dog faeces in Paris and other French cities.

Introduced in 1982 by Jacques Chirac (then Mayor of Paris), the idea was to provide a rapid mobile strike force, which could travel great distances with access to sidewalks in a minimum of time, to perform a very specific action. The fleet of 100 vehicles was based initially on Yamaha XT 550 and later the XT 600, with a large tank to the rear which housed both water and waste, attached to a vacuum-powered hose which was placed over the material required to be removed.

The project was abandoned in 2002, for a new and better enforced local law which now fines dog owners up to 500 euros for not removing their dog faeces. It was estimated at the time of their removal, that the fleet of 70 Motocrottes were cleaning up only 20% of dog faeces on Parisian streets, for an annual cost of £3million. Use continued in other French cities including Montpellier as of 2016.

See also
Pooper-scooper

References

External links
Paris-Chiens

History of Paris
Dog equipment
Waste collection vehicles
Utility motorcycles